Ernest Yates (18 January 1915 – 19 March 1980) was a British figure skater. He competed in the pairs event at the 1936 Winter Olympics.

References

External links
 

1915 births
1980 deaths
British male pair skaters
Olympic figure skaters of Great Britain
Figure skaters at the 1936 Winter Olympics
Place of birth missing